is a prefecture of Japan located in the Tōhoku region of Honshu. Yamagata Prefecture has a population of 1,079,950 (1 June 2019) and has a geographic area of 9,325 km2 (3,600 sq mi). Yamagata Prefecture borders Akita Prefecture to the north, Miyagi Prefecture to the east, Fukushima Prefecture to the south, and Niigata Prefecture to the southwest.

Yamagata is the capital and largest city of Yamagata Prefecture, with other major cities including Tsuruoka, Sakata, and Yonezawa. Yamagata Prefecture is located on Japan's western Sea of Japan coast and its borders with neighboring prefectures are formed by various mountain ranges, with 17% of its total land area being designated as Natural Parks. Yamagata Prefecture formed the southern half of the historic Dewa Province with Akita Prefecture and is home to the Three Mountains of Dewa, which includes the Haguro Five-story Pagoda, a recognised National Treasure of Japan.

History 

The aboriginal  people once inhabited the area now known as Yamagata. Yamagata and Akita Prefecture were known as Dewa Province until the Meiji Restoration.

During the Heian period (794–1185), the  family ruled the area. Yamagata City flourished during the Edo period (1603–1867) due to its status as a castle town and post station, famous for beni (red safflower dye used in the production of handspun silk). In 1689, the famous haiku poet, Matsuo Bashō visited Yamagata during his five-month trip to the northern regions of Japan.

Geography 

Yamagata Prefecture is located in the southwest corner of Tōhoku, facing the Sea of Japan. It borders Niigata Prefecture and Fukushima Prefecture on the south, Miyagi Prefecture on the east, and Akita Prefecture on the north. All of these boundaries are marked by mountains, with most of the population residing in a limited central plain.

As of 31 March 2020, 17 percent of the total land area of the prefecture was designated as Natural Parks, namely the Bandai-Asahi National Park; Chōkai, Kurikoma, and Zaō Quasi-National Parks; and Goshōzan, Kabusan, Kennan, Mogamigawa, Shōnai Kaihin, and Tendō Kōgen Prefectural Natural Parks.

Cities

Thirteen cities are located in Yamagata Prefecture:

Towns and villages

These are the towns and villages in each district:

Mergers

Climate 
The climate of Yamagata Prefecture is characterized by long, hot, and humid summers and long, snowy winters. Both spring and autumn are short, the former often cold, the latter often warm, but both quite dry and sunny. Yamagata Prefecture, along with northern parts of Miyagi and Iwate are the transition areas from humid subtropical climate (Koppen Cfa/Cwa) to humid continental within the Japan mainland. Winter temperatures rarely fall below  in populated areas; they frequently rise above  in July and August. Precipitation falls all year round and the remnants of one or perhaps two typhoons usually pass through between August and October. The winters see heavy snowfall especially at higher elevations, though the Japan Sea coast (Sakata) is milder and has more rain. Snowfall for Shinjō is typical of populated mountainous areas, snowfall for Yamagata City typical of the valleys.

Economy

Fruit

Yamagata Prefecture is the largest producer of cherries and pears in Japan. A large quantity of other kinds of fruits such as grapes, apples, peaches, melons, persimmons and watermelons are also produced.

Demographics 

As of October 2020, Yamagata Prefecture had a population of 1,068,027. As of October 2019, 33.4% of the population was over 65 with 15.5% aged between 65 and 74 and 17.9% over 75. This is an increase of 8.5% over census data from 2004 where 12.8% of the population was aged between 65 and 74, and 12.1% was over 75.

Yamagata prefecture experienced its greatest growth period following the end of World War II, but then quickly began to slow down and eventually decline steadily. Today, the population is nearly the same as it was in 1930.

City life
Yamagata City is the central hub for Yamagata Prefecture and has many shops and restaurants around its main station.  It is also the location with the most western hotels and the primarily place of lodging for visitors visiting this region. This city serves as a good hub to visit the surrounding cities and towns around this prefecture with bus lines and train lines linking almost every part of Yamagata from the station. 

There are also many bars near the station giving this city a good night life for visitors to enjoy at the front of the station as well as the nanukamachi district in the downtown area of the city.

Festivals and events
Yamagata Prefecture has a number of annual festivals and events.

The largest is the Yamagata Hanagasa Festival (花笠祭り) which takes place in Yamagata City on the first weekend in August, when thousands of people perform the hanagasa dance in the city centre and attracts up to 300,000 spectators. Yamagata City is the home of the bi-annual Yamagata International Documentary Film Festival in October.

In February, a snow lantern festival is held in Yonezawa at the Uesugi Shrine. Hundreds of candle-lit lanterns light pathways dug into the snow around the shrine. Yonezawa is also the site of the Uesugi Festival (上杉祭り, uesugi matsuri) in mid-spring. The festival's highlight is a re-enactment of the Battle of Kawanakajima on the banks of the Matsukawa River.

In September, Yamagata Prefecture is famous for its imoni, a taro-root stew popular in Northern Japan during the autumn. Imonikai, taro-root soup parties, are very popular during this season, and many tourists come to Yamagata Prefecture specifically for its particular style of imoni.

Art
Beginning in 2003, Yamagata city officials with the aid of Tōhoku University of Art and Design began a three-year project in which the Buddhist art of the city's temples would be catalogued and compared to a set of guidelines in order to identify "cultural assets". One hundred and ninety temples have had their works of art examined and several significant examples of Buddhist sculpture have been discovered. At Heisenji Temple, in the Hirashimizu district, a particularly rare statue, a seated Vairocana Buddha made from zelkova wood, was found. Other significant works include sculptures from the Heian period (794–1185) and Kamakura period (1192–1333).

The Yamagata Museum of Art, located in Yamagata City, was opened in 1964 through the efforts of a foundation led by Yoshio Hattori, the president of Yamagata Shimbun and Yamagata Broadcasting Co, Ltd. The permanent collection consists of three types of art: Japanese and Asian, regional, and French. Special exhibitions are held periodically.

Language
Yamagata Prefecture is known for its local dialect Yamagata-ben, sometimes thought of as backward sounding in other parts of Japan. The 2004 movie Swing Girls (スウィングガールズ), co-written and directed by Shinobu Yaguchi, is set in Yamagata and makes use of Yamagata-ben for comedic purposes.

Sports 

The sports teams listed below are based in Yamagata.

Football
Montedio Yamagata

Volleyball
Pioneer Red Wings  (Tendō)

Basketball
Passlab Yamagata Wyverns

Transportation

Airports
 Yamagata Airport (Tokyo, Osaka, Nagoya, Sapporo by Japan Airlines)
 Shonai Airport (Tokyo, Osaka, Sapporo by All Nippon Airways)

Railways

Yamagata Shinkansen
Senzan Line
Aterazawa Line
Yonesaka Line
Rikuu West Line
Rikuu East Line
Flower Nagai Line
Ōu Main Line
Uetsu Main Line

Tourism 
The temple of Yama-dera, carved into the mountainside near the city of Yamagata, is a major attraction.

The Dewa Sanzan are three holy mountains that form a traditional pilgrimage for followers of the Shugendō branch of Shintō. The famous Gojudo (five-story pagoda) is at the base of Mount Haguro, the lowest of the three mountains.

Mount Zaō is a famous winter ski resort, also known for its snow monsters (frozen snow-covered trees) in the winter, and the Okama crater lake, also known as the Goshiki Numa (Five Color Lake) because its colour changes according to the weather.

Ginzan Onsen (銀山温泉) is a Silver Mountain hot spring town located in the mountains of Obanazawa City, Yamagata Prefecture. The area originally developed around a silver mine. However, these days it is better known as one of Japan’s prettiest onsen towns with historic ryokan alongside river.

Media

Newspapers
Yamagata Shimbun 
Yonezawa Shimbun
Shonai Nippo
Okitama Times

TV and radio
YBC TV and Radio (NNN, JRN, and NRN)
YTS TV (ANN)
TUY TV (JNN)
SAY TV (FNN)
Rhythm Station (JFN)

Film
Yamagata International Documentary Film Festival

Notes

References
 Nussbaum, Louis-Frédéric and Käthe Roth. (2005).  Japan encyclopedia. Cambridge: Harvard University Press. ; OCLC 58053128

External links 

Yamagata Prefecture Official Website 

 
Tōhoku region
Prefectures of Japan